Bembecia syzcjovi is a moth of the family Sesiidae. It is found in Turkey, Georgia and Iran.

Adults are on wing in late August and September.

The larvae feed on the roots of Astragalus species, including Astragalus ponticus.

Subspecies
Bembecia syzcjovi syzcjovi (Turkey, Georgia)
Bembecia syzcjovi kappadocica Špatenka, 1997 (Turkish Kappadocia)
Bembecia syzcjovi alborzica Kallies & Špatenka, 2003 (Iran)

References

Moths described in 1990
Sesiidae
Moths of Europe
Moths of Asia